Datuk Wan Mohammad Khair-il Anuar bin Wan Ahmad (16 January 1960 – 5 May 2016) was a Malaysian politician, architect, and entrepreneur who served as the Member of Parliament (MP) for Kuala Kangsar from May 2013 to his death right after three years in May 2016. He also served as the Chairman of Malaysian Palm Oil Board (MPOB). He was a native of Kuala Kangsar. Wan Khair-il Anuar was a member of the United Malays National Organisation (UMNO) in the Barisan Nasional (BN) coalition.

Education
Wan Khair-il Anuar received his primary education in Sekolah Kebangsaan Clifford, Kuala Kangsar from 1967 to 1972. During his secondary education, he went to three different schools: Sekolah Menengah Clifford, Sekolah Menengah Anderson and Sungai Petani Science School (Boarding School) in Kedah.

With an excellent achievement during his secondary education, Wan Khair-il Anuar was sent by the government to  further his studies in  architecture abroad. His first stop was the City College Plymouth, where he obtained distinction in his "A level" program. Then, he was accepted to the Kingston University where he was awarded a BA (Hons) Architecture and Master in Architecture.

Professional career
In 1990, Wan Khair-il Anuar set up an architecture firm, which is based in Kuala Lumpur. Wan Khair-il Anuar was also appointed as Chairman of Malaysian Palm Oil Board (MPOB). He has also been a board member of Damansara Realty Berhad, a public listed company.

Wan Khair-il Anuar was inducted into various professional organizations. In 1990, he became a member of Pertubuhan Arkitek Malaysia (PAM), followed by Royal Institute of British Architects (RIBA) in 1992 and Institut Perekabentuk Dalaman Malaysia (IPDM) in 1995.

Political career
 Committee Members of UMNO Youth's Kuala Kangsar Division: 1989–1993
 Head of UMNO Youth's Branch: 1989–2002
 Head of UMNO Youth's Kuala Kangsar Division: 1998–2001
 Deputy Chairman of UMNO's Informative Youth Malaysia: 1999–2000
 Exco of UMNO Youth Malaysia: 2000–2004
 Head of UMNO Bukit Chandan's Branch: 2002
 Deputy Head of UMNO Kuala Kangsar Division: 2004–2012
 Members of State Legislative Assembly Bukit Chandan: 2008–2012
 Head of UMNO Kuala Kangsar Division: 2013–2016

Death
Wan Khair-il Anuar was killed in an AS 350 helicopter crash near Sebuyau, Sarawak. He was travelling with several other government officials from Betong to Kuching on 5 May 2016 when the helicopter lost contact with ground officials. Debris were found near Batang Lupar river the following day. The tragedy also involved Tan Sri Dato' Hajjah Noriah Kasnon, the Deputy Minister of Plantation Industries and Commodities and member of parliament for Sungai Besar, Selangor. Wan Mohammad Khair-il Anuar's remains were flown back to Perak and he was laid to rest at the Al-Ghufran Royal Mausoleum near Ubudiah Mosque, Kuala Kangsar.

His widow, Mastura Mohd Yazid who was picked by BN to re-contest the Kuala Kangsar by-election, had successfully defended the seat to succeed him as the new MP of Kuala Kangsar.

Election results

Honours
  :
  Commander of the Order of Meritorious Service (PJN) - Datuk (2016)

References

External links
Wan Khair-il Anuar on Facebook
Wan Khair-il Anuar on Twitter
 Wan Khair-il Anuar on Instagram

1960 births
2016 deaths
People from Perak
Malaysian people of Malay descent
Malaysian Muslims
Malaysian architects
Malaysian businesspeople
United Malays National Organisation politicians
Members of the Dewan Rakyat
Members of the Perak State Legislative Assembly
Alumni of Kingston University
Commanders of the Order of Meritorious Service
Victims of helicopter accidents or incidents
Victims of aviation accidents or incidents in Malaysia
21st-century Malaysian politicians